Antonin, Antonín, and Antoñín are masculine given names. Antonín, a Czech name in use in the Czech Republic, and Antonin, a French name in use in France, and French-speaking countries, are both considered alternate forms of Antonino. Antoñín, a Spanish name in use in Spain and Spanish-speaking countries, is a diminutive form of Antonio. As a surname it is derived from the Antonius root name. Notable people with these names include:

Given name: Antonin

Antonin Artaud (1896–1948), French theatre director, writer, actor, and artist
Antonin Bajewski (1915–1941), Polish Franciscan friar
Antonin Baudry (born 1975), French diplomat
Antonin Berruyer (born 1998), French rugby union player
Antonin Berval (1891–1966), French film actor
Antonin Besse (1877–1951), French businessman
Antonin Bobichon (born 1995), French footballer
Antonin Brémond (died 1755), French Master of the Order of Preachers
Antonin Carlès (1851–1919), French sculptor
Antonin Cloche (1628–1720), French Master of the Order of Preachers
Antonin d'Avrecourt (fl. 1831–1862), French playwright
Antonin Décarie (born 1982), Canadian boxer
Antonin Jean Desormeaux (1815–1894), French physician
Antonin Drapier (1891–1967), French Catholic priest and diplomat
Antonin Dubost (1842–1921), French journalist and politician
Antonin Gadal (1877–1962), French mystic
Antonin Galipeault (1879–1971), Canadian politician, lawyer, and judge
Antonin Guigonnat (born 1991), French biathlete
Antonin Guillermain (1861–1896), French Catholic missionary
Antonin Idrac (1849–1884), French sculptor
Antonin Koutouan (born 1983), Ivorian footballer
Antonin Magne (1904–1983), French cyclist
Antonin Manavian (born 1987), French hockey player
Antonin Mercié (1845–1916), French sculptor and painter
Antonin Michel, French Scrabble player
Antonin Moine (1796–1849), French romantic sculptor
Antonin de Selliers de Moranville (1852–1945), Belgian general
Antonin Nantel (1839–1929), Canadian Catholic priest
Antonin Claude Dominique Just de Noailles (1777–1846), French nobleman and diplomat
Antonin-Just-Léon-Marie de Noailles (1866–1900), French nobleman 
Antonin Perbòsc (1861–1944), French poet
Antonin Poncet (1849–1913), French surgeon
Antonin Proust (1932–1905), French journalist and politician
Antonin Rolland (born 1924), French cyclist
Antonin Rouzier (born 1986), French volleyball player
Antonin Scalia (1936–2016), Associate Justice of the Supreme Court of the United States
Antonin Sertillanges (1863–1948), French Catholic philosopher and writer
Antonin Sochnev (1924–2014), Soviet Russian football player and coach
Antonin Trilles (born 1983), French footballer

Given name: Antonín

Antonín Absolon Czech canoeist
Antonín Barák (born 1994), Czech football
Antonín Barák (rowing) (born 1956), Czech rowing coxswain
Antonín Bartoň (1908–1982), Czech skier
Antonín Bartoněk (1926–2016), Czech philologist
Antonín Bartoš (1910–1998), Czech soldier
Antonín Viktor Barvitius (1823–1901), Czech architect
Antonín Baudyš (1946–2010), Czech politician
Antonín Bečvář (1901–1965), Czech astronomer 
Antonín Bennewitz (1833–1926), Czech classical musician
Antonin Berousek of the Czech circus performing Berousek family
Antonín Bořuta (born 1988), Czech ice hockey player
Antonín Brabec (canoeist) (1946–2017), Czech canoeist
Antonín Brabec (rugby) (born 1973), Czech rugby player
Antonín Brož (born 1987), Czech luger 
Antonín Brych, Czech sports shooter
Antonín Brus z Mohelnice (1518–1580), Moravian Archbishop of Prague
Antonín Buček (born 1984), Czech footballer
Antonín Byczanski (1887 –?), Czech sports shooter
Antonín Carvan (1901–1959), Czech football
Antonín Charvát (1899–1930), Czech cyclist
Antonín Chittussi (1847–1891), Czech painter
Antonín Dvořák (1841–1904), Czech composer
Antonín Dušek (born 1986), Czech ice hockey player
Antonín Eltschkner (1880–1961), Czech Roman Catholic priest
Antonín Engel (1879–1958), Czech architect
Antonín Ettrich Czech cross country skier
Antonín Fantiš (born 1992), Czech footballer
Antonín Fivébr (1888–1973), Czech footballer
Antonin Fritsch (1832–1913), Czech scientist
Antonín Hájek (born 1987), Czech ski jumper 
Antonín Havlík, Czech scholar known for Havlík's law
Antonín Heveroch (1869–1927), Czech psychiatrist and neurologist
Antonín Hojer (1894–1964), Czech footballer
Antonín Holub (born 1986), Czech football
Antonín Holý (1936–2012), Czech scientist
Antonín Honig, Czech cyclist
Antonín Hrstka (1908–?), Czech rower
Antonín Hudeček (1872–1941), Czech painter
Antonín Janda (1892–1960), Czech footballer
Antonín Janoušek (1877–1941), Czech journalist and politician
Antonín Jelínek (born 1956), Czech wrestler
Antonín Jeřábek (born 1982), Czech ice hockey referee
Antonín Jílek (1880–?), Czech sports shooter
Antonín Jan Jungmann (1775–1854), Czech obstetrician and educator
Antonín Kachlík (born 1923), Czech film director and screenwriter
Antonín Kalina (1902–1990), Czech resistance citizen
Antonín Kammel (1730–1784/85), Czech composer
Antonín Kasper Jr. (1962–2006), Czech motorcycle racer
Antonín Kinský (born 1975), Czech footballer
Antonín Klimek (1937–2005), Czech historian
Antonín Kraft (1749–1820), Czech composer
Antonín Křapka (born 1994), Czech football
Antonín Kohout (1919–2013), Czech cellist 
Antonín Koláček (born 1959), Czech manager and entrepreneur
Antonín Kraft (1749–1820), Czech composer
Antonín Kramerius (1939–2019), Czech footballer
Antonín Kratochvíl (born 1947), Czech photojournalist
Antonín Kříž (biathlete) (born 1953), Czech biathlete
Antonín Kříž (cyclist) (born 1943), Czech cyclist
Antonín Kubálek (1935–2011), Czech classical pianist
Antonín Langweil (1791–1837), Czech artist
Antonín Lhota (1812–1905), Czech painter
Antonín J. Liehm (1924–2020) Czech journalist
Antonín Liška (1924–2003), Czech Roman Catholic clergyman
Antonín Machek (1775–1844), Czech painter
Antonín Maleček (1909–1964), Czech table tennis player
Antonín Malinkovič (born 1930), Czech rower
Antonín Mánes (1784–1843), Czech painter and draftsman
Antonín Máša (1935–2001), Czech film director and screenwriter
Antonín Melka (born 1990), Czech ice hockey player
Antonín Mikala, Czech fencer
Antonín Mlejnský (born 1973), Czech footballer
Antonín Molčík (1939–2014), Czech actor 
Antonín Mrkos (1918–1996), Czech astronomer
Antonin Nechodoma (1877–1928), Czech architect
Antonín Novotný (1904–1975), Czech politician
Antonín Novotný (chess composer) (1827–1871), Czech chess composer
Antonín Panenka (born 1948), Czech footballer
Antonín Pechanec (born 1991), Czech ice hockey player
Antonín Perič (1896–1980), Czech cyclist
Antonín Perner (1899–1973), Czech footballer
Antonín Petrof (1839–1915), Czech piano maker
Antonín Plachý (born 1971), Czech footballer 
Antonín Pospíšil (1903–1973), Czech politician
Antonín Prachař (born 1962), Czech politician
Antonín Presl (born 1988), Czech footballer
Antonín Přidal (1935–2017), Czech translator
Antonín Procházka (actor) (born 1953) Czech actor, playwright and director
Antonín Procházka (painter) (1882–1945), Czech painter and graphic artist
Antonín Procházka (volleyball) (born 1942), Czech volleyball player
Antonín Puč (1907–1988), Czech footballer
Antonin Raymond (1888–1976), Czech architect
Antonín Reichenauer (c. 1694–1730), Czech composer
Antonín Rezek (1853–1909), Czech political historian
Antonín Rosa (born 1986), Czech footballer
Antonín Rükl (1932–2016), Czech astronomer, cartographer, and author
Antonín Růsek (born 1999), Czech footballer
Antonín Růžička (born 1993), Czech ice hockey player
Antonín Rýgr (1921–1989), Czech footballer
Antonín Siegl (1880–?), Czech sports shooter
Antonín Skopový (born 1902), Czech wrestler
Antonín Slavíček (1870–1910), Czech painter
Antonín Šolc (1928–1996), Czech footballer
Antonín Sova (1864–1928), Czech poet
Antonín Šponar (1920–2002), Czech alpine skier
Antonín Stavjaňa (born 1963), Czech ice hockey player
Antonín Cyril Stojan (1851–1923), Czech Roman Catholic prelate
Antonín Šváb Jr. (born 1974), Czech motorcycle racer
Antonín Švehla (1873–1933), Czech politician
Antonín Svoboda (athlete) (1900–1965), Czech sprint athlete
Antonín Svoboda (computer scientist) (1907–1980), Czech computer scientist, mathematician, electrical engineer, and researcher
Antonín Benjamin Svojsík (1876–1938), Czech scouting leader
Antonín Švorc (1934–2011), Czech operatic singer
Antonín Tučapský (1928–2014), Czech composer
Antonín Vaníček (born 1998), Czech footballer
Antonín Vodička (1907–1975), Czech footballer
Antonín Vranický (1761–1820), Czech composer
Antonín Žalský (born 1980), Czech shot putter
Antonín Zápotocký (1884–1957), Czech politician

Nickname
Antoñín (footballer, born 2000), nickname of Antonio Cortés Heredia (born 2000), Spanish footballer
Antonin Idrac, nickname of Jean-Antoine-Marie Idrac (1849–1884), French sculptor

Surname
Arnold Antonin (born 1942), Haitian film director
Magdalena Saint Antonin (born 1965), Argentine skier
Théodore Antonin, French football manager

Middle name

Alexandre-Antonin Taché (1823–1894), Canadian Roman Catholic priest
Bedřich Antonín Wiedermann (1883–1951), Czech composer
František Antonín Míča (1694–1744), Czech conductor
František Antonín Nickerl (1813–1871), Czech entomologist
Frédéric-Antonin Breysse (1907–2001), French cartoonist and illustrator
Jan Antonín Baťa (1898–1965), Czech shoe manufacturer
Jan Antonín Duchoslav (born 1965), Czech actor
Jan Antonín Koželuh (1738–1814), Czech composer
Jan Antonín Losy (c. 1650–1721), Czech composer and aristocrat
Jan Antonín Vocásek (1706 - 1757), Czech painter
Josef Antonín Hůlka (1851 - 1920), Czech Roman Catholic clergyman
Josef Antonín Plánický (1691–1732), Czech composer
Josef Antonín Sehling (1710–1756), Czech composer
Rudolf Antonín Dvorský (1899–1966), Czech singer and jazz musician
Stefan Antonin Mdzewski (1653–1718), Polish Roman Catholic prelate
Václav Antonín Chotek real name of Count Wenzel Chotek of Chotkow and Wognin (1674–1754), Czech nobleman and politician

Fictional characters
Antonin Dolohov, Death Eater character in the Harry Potter novels and films

See also

Antoin (disambiguation) 
Antolin (name)
Antoni
Antonia (name) 
Antonic
Antonie (given name)
Antonik
Antonina (name)
Antonine (name)
Antonini (name)
Antonino (name)
Antoniny (disambiguation)
Antonio
Antonis
Antoniu

Notes

Czech masculine given names
French masculine given names
Spanish masculine given names